Philip Lynch (born 1946) is an Irish businessman who has held the position of chief executive at two Irish public limited companies and multiple senior directorships including chairman of the board of An Post. In October 2010, he was forced by the then Irish minister for health, Mary Harney, to resign his position as chairman of the National Paediatric Hospital Development Board over his desire to relocate the new Irish children's hospital from Dublin city centre to a site near the M50 motorway.

Background and education
Lynch was born at Innishannon, County Cork. He was educated at Hamilton High School, County Cork, Copsewood College in County Limerick and studied accountancy and economics at Waterford Regional Technical College.

Business career

Lynch formerly served as the chief executive of IAWS
, a non executive director for 
ARYZTA AG
and 
A.Hiestand Holding AG
, the chief executive officer and Executive Director for 
One51 plc
, and as the director for 
Irish Pride Bakeries Ltd.
. 

After 1995, he formerly served as the 
Independent non-executive director, a Member of the Nomination Committee and a Member of the Remuneration Committee
for FBD Holdings plc. and was the 
Non-executive director and Director of Irish Food Marketing
for Irish Life & Permanent Group Holdings plc
from 2003-2005.

From 2004 to the present day Lynch worked for 
Heiton Group plc
and C&C Group plc. Currently, he is the non executive director of 
Heiton Group plc
as well as a Nominations Committee Member and Remuneration Committee Member for the company, and, simultaneously, is also the 
non-executive director, a Chairman of Sub-Committee, a Chairman of Remuneration Committee, and a Nomination Committee Member
for C&C Group plc.

Children's hospital controversy
In 2007, he was appointed by Minister for Health, Mary Harney as chairman of the National Paediatric Hospital Development Board. This was to be a €650m project to build a new national children's hospital adjacent to the Mater Misericordiae University Hospital in Dublin city centre. The new hospital would amalgamate the secondary and tertiary care functions of three existing children's hospitals in Dublin: Our Lady's Children's Hospital, Crumlin; Temple Street Children's University Hospital; and the National Children's Hospital at Tallaght Hospital.

In 2010, Lynch met the Crumlin Hospital Foundation to discuss the possibility of relocating the new hospital to the Crumlin Hospital site. He also met with property developer Noel Smyth to discuss relocating the hospital to a site outside the M50 owned by Smyth. When Lynch sought to present to the board a proposal to build the new hospital on Smyth's land, he was obliged to resign his position by Mary Harney. He was replaced as chairman by businessman John Gallagher.

In March 2011, after a new health minister was appointed following a general election, Lynch went on radio to make the case that the a city centre location for the new hospital would be inaccessible and have parking difficulties. He said that the 'people who designed the M50, when that was agreed on, everything was going to happen outside of that' and described the city centre as a 'cul-de-sac'. He described the decision to locate the hospital in the city centre as 'political'.

One51 shareholder revolt
In 2010, Philip Lynch was paid €1.4m including bonus as chief executive of One51 plc. A shareholder revolt ensued at the company's AGM in July. Rebel shareholders led by Gerry Killen, Alf Smiddy, Mike Soden and Peter Brennan, criticised Lynch's remuneration in a year in which the company reported a loss of €11m and challenged his reappointment. Lynch survived the revolt.

Court case over bank loan
In March 2011, a court hearing was held in relation to an unpaid loan for €25m owed to AIB by Lynch, his wife and four children. The loan was secured on land in Waterford. In his defence, Lynch says that the loan was made on a non-recourse basis. On 8 December 2011 the Irish Courts found in favour of AIB.

One 51 Dismissal
On 1 July 2011, Lynch was apparently dismissed from One51. A drop in share price, shareholder discontent with his remuneration package and a Revenue investigation into the routing of patent royalties into a bonus scheme which was paid directly to himself and other individuals were believed to have contributed to Lynch's dismissal.

References

1946 births
Living people
Businesspeople from County Cork
Irish chief executives
Alumni of Waterford Institute of Technology